Cintrón or Cintron is a surname of Puerto Rican origin. Famous people with the surname Cintron:

Alex Cintrón (born 1978), Major League Baseball infielder
Carlos Juan Cintrón (1918–1998), mayor of Ponce, Puerto Rico from 1957 to 1961
Conchita Cintrón (1922–2009), Chilean torera (female bullfighter)
José Vicente Ferrer de Otero y Cintrón (1912–1992), Puerto Rican actor, theater and film director
Juan H. Cintrón García (1919–2012), Puerto Rican politician, Mayor of Ponce 1968–1972
Kermit Cintrón (born 1979), Puerto Rican boxer who is from Carolina, Puerto Rico
Manolo Cintron (born 1963), former Puerto Rican professional basketball player
Manuel Egozcue Cintrón (1855–1906), born in Bilbao, Spain
Marty Cintron, American singer, member of the American pop band No Mercy
Nemir Matos-Cintrón (born 1949), Puerto Rican author who currently resides in Florida
Nitza Margarita Cintron (born 1950), Chief of Space Medicine & Health Care Systems Office at NASA's Johnson Space Center
Rosendo Matienzo Cintrón (1855–1913), lawyer and political leader
Sharon Cintron (born 1945), American model and actress